The extraembryonic membranes are four membranes which assist in the development of an animal's embryo.  Such membranes occur in a range of animals from humans to insects.  They originate from the embryo, but are not considered part of it.  They typically perform roles in nutrition, gas exchange, and waste removal.

There are four standard extraembryonic membranes in birds, reptiles, and mammals: the yolk sac which surrounds the yolk, the amnion which surrounds and cushions the embryo, the allantois which among avians stores embryonic waste and assists with the exchange of carbon dioxide with oxygen as well as the resorption of calcium from the shell, and the chorion which surrounds all of these and in avians successively merges with the allantois in the later stages of egg development to form a combined respiratory and excretory organ called the chorioallantois.

The extraembryonic membranes in insects include a serous membrane originating from blastoderm cells, an amnion or amniotic cavity whose expression is controlled by the Zerknüllt gene, and a yolk sac. 

In humans and other mammals they are more usually called fetal membranes.

References

Embryology